The council of the Matzikama Local Municipality in the Western Cape, South Africa is elected every five years by a system of mixed-member proportional representation. Eight councillors are elected by first-past-the-post voting in eight wards, while the remaining seven are chosen from party lists so that the total number of party representatives is proportional to the number of votes received. In the election of 1 November 2021 the Democratic Alliance (DA) won a plurality of six seats on the council.

Results 
The following table shows the composition of the council after past elections.

December 2000 election

The following table shows the results of the 2000 election.

October 2002 floor crossing

In terms of the Eighth Amendment of the Constitution and the judgment of the Constitutional Court in United Democratic Movement v President of the Republic of South Africa and Others, in the period from 8–22 October 2002 councillors had the opportunity to cross the floor to a different political party without losing their seats. In the Matzikama council, four councillors from the Democratic Alliance (DA) crossed to the New National Party (NNP), which had formerly been part of the DA.

September 2004 floor crossing
Another floor-crossing period occurred on 1–15 September 2004, in which one of the NNP councillors crossed to the ANC.

March 2006 election

The following table shows the results of the 2006 election.

September 2007 floor crossing
The final floor-crossing period occurred on 1–15 September 2007; floor-crossing was subsequently abolished in 2008 by the Fifteenth Amendment of the Constitution. In the Matzikama council one councillor crossed from the Democratic Alliance to the South African Political Alliance.

By-elections from September 2007 to May 2011
The following by-elections were held to fill vacant ward seats in the period between the floor crossing period in September 2007 and the election in May 2011.

May 2011 election

At the election of 18 May 2011, the council was expanded to 15 members with the addition of one new ward and one new PR list seats. The Democratic Alliance won 7 seats, one short of a majority.

The following table shows the results of the 2011 election.

By-elections from May 2011 to August 2016
The following by-elections were held to fill vacant ward seats in the period between the elections in May 2011 and August 2016.

August 2016 election

The following table shows the results of the 2016 election.

By-elections from August 2016 to 2021 
The following by-elections were held to fill vacant ward seats in the period between the elections since August 2016.

In July 2018, the ANC's Hennie Nel was elected mayor after the resignation of the DA's Rhenda Stephan. In August 2018, the DA's Johan van der Hoven was elected as mayor.

After the second by-election, the ANC became the largest party as the council was reconfigured as seen below:

The local council sends two representatives to the council of the West Coast District Municipality: one from the ANC and one from the DA.

November 2021 election

The following table shows the results of the 2021 election.

By-elections from November 2021 
The following by-elections were held to fill vacant ward seats in the period since November 2021.

After the by-election, the council was reconfigured as below:

Notes

References

Matzikama Local Municipality
Overstrand
Elections in the Western Cape